"Sometime Samurai" is a song written and performed by Japanese music producer Towa Tei and Australian singer Kylie Minogue for Tei's album Flash (2005). It was originally recorded as a demo alongside "GBI (German Bold Italic)" in 1996, but remained unreleased for eight years until Minogue had the opportunity to re-record her vocals in 2003. Before its inclusion on Flash, the song was mentioned in Minogue's book Kylie: La La La. The song was written about Minogue's then-boyfriend, photographer Stéphane Sednaoui.

It was released in Japan as a promotional radio single to promote the release of Flash. A music video was also made for the song, but did not feature Minogue as she was busy touring her Showgirl: The Greatest Hits Tour.

Background and composition
In 1996, coming back to a studio in Sangenjaya, Setagaya, Japan after going for drinks, Tei received a hand-written fax that had "a picture of some sort" on it that said: "Music with you! Kylie. Call Me". She then came to Japan to perform and met Tei, at which point they worked on some songs for her album at Sangenjaya. The results of the session were "GBI (German Bold Italic)" and a demo of "Sometime Samurai", with Chisato Moritaka's drums being included. "GBI" was released as a single in 1997, while "Sometime Samurai" was left uncompleted.

Minogue especially liked "Sometime Samurai", but her record company did not understand it, and it was ignored. By the time Tei was working on his fifth studio album Flash in late 2003, Minogue contacted Tei for the first time in years, saying: "I can't get over that song either. I should be able to sing it better now, so I'd like to re-record it. Can you come to London?" The song was finally completed in London and included on Tei's album.

Dan Grunebaum from Japanese English-language magazine Metropolis described the track as "about as kitschy as they come, with the lithesome Minogue burbling over a four-to-the-floor house beat and elastic, sampled sitars."

Release and reception

Visuals
The music video for the song was directed by Daniel Gorrel and edited by Evan Andrews.

"Sometime Samurai" is featured as a backdrop interlude video on Minogue's KylieX2008 concert tour.

Formats and track listings
Japanese promotional radio CD single
"Sometime Samurai" (Radio edit) – 3:39

Japanese limited released Melody / Sometime Samurai 12" EP
"Melody" – 6:13
"Melodypella" – 2:24
"Risk Some Soul" – 4:33
"Sometime Samurai" – 3:58
"Red Card Jumbo" – 0:44

Credits and personnel
 Lyrics and music – Kylie Minogue and Towa Tei
 Vocals – Kylie Minogue
 E.Guitars – Hiroshi Takano and Hajime Tachibana
 Bass and Moog – Yumiko Ohno
 Drums – Chisato Moritaka
 A Samurai – Stéphane Sednaoui

References

2005 singles
1996 songs
Kylie Minogue songs
Songs written by Kylie Minogue
Songs written by Towa Tei
Towa Tei songs